The surname Hayden has several origins. In some cases it is a form of O'Hayden, which is derived from the Irish Ó hÉideáin and Ó hÉidín. These latter surnames mean "descendant of Éideán" and "descendant of Éidín", respectively; the Irish personal names Éideán and Éidín are likely derived from the Irish éideadh, which means "clothes", "armour".

In some cases the surname Hayden is derived from placenames in England that have various origins. For example, the placename Haydon occurs in Northumberland, and is derived from the Old English word elements heg ("hay") and denu ("valley"). Other places in Dorset, Hertfordshire, Somerset, and Wiltshire are derived from either the Old English word elements hēg ("hay") and dūn ("hill"), or from hege ("hedge") and dūn, or from (ge)hæg ("enclosure") and dūn.

In some cases the surname Hayden is a form of the Jewish surname Heiden.

People with the surname
 Ada Hayden (1884–1950), American botanist
 Alyssa Hayden (born 1970), Australian politician
 Anthony Hayden (born 1961), judge of the High Court of England and Wales since 2013
 Basil Hayden (1899–2003), American college basketball player and coach
 Bea Hayden (born 1984) Taiwanese model and actress of American descent
 Benjamin Hayden (1822–1908), American lawyer and politician
 Bill Hayden (born 1933), former Governor-General of Australia
 Bob Hayden, U.S. hockey referee
 Brent Hayden (born 1983), Canadian swimmer
 Carl Hayden (1877–1972), United States Representative and Senator
 Charles Hayden (1870–1937), American financier and philanthropist
 Charles T. Hayden (1825–1900), American businessman and probate judge
 Dan Hayden (baseball) (born 1984), American college baseball coach
 Diana Hayden (born 1973), former Miss World and model from India
 Erika Check Hayden, American journalist
 Emily Spencer Hayden (1869–1949), 19th and 20th century American photographer
 Ferdinand Vandeveer Hayden (1829–1887), 19th century American geologist
 Garey Hayden, American bridge player
 Gene Hayden (1935–2003), American professional baseball pitcher
 Gillette Hayden, pioneering dentist and periodontist in the early 20th century
 Harry Hayden (1882–1955), Canadian actor
 Henry Hubert Hayden, (1869-1923), Anglo-Irish geologist who worked in India and a mountaineer
 Horace H. Hayden (1769–1844), first licensed American dentist and dentistry school founder 
 Isaac Hayden (born 1995), English footballer
 James Hayden (1953–1983),  American actor
 Jane Hayden (born 1957), English actress
 Jeffrey Hayden (1926–2016), television director and producer
 Joel Hayden (1798–1873), 19th-century Massachusetts politician
 John Hayden (disambiguation), multiple people
 Josephine Hayden, Republican Sinn Féin politician
 Kelvin Hayden (born 1983), American football player
 Leo Hayden (born 1948), former National Football League running back
 Lewis Hayden (1811–1889), African American leader, ex-slave, abolitionist and businessman
 Linda Hayden (actress) (born 1953), English film and television actress
 Matthew Hayden (born 1971), Australian cricketer
Martha Nessler Hayden (born 1936), American painter
 Melissa Hayden (actress) (born 1969), American actress
 Melissa Hayden (dancer) (1923–2006), Canadian ballerina
 Michael V. Hayden, U.S. Air Force General and Director, Central Intelligence Agency
 Mike Hayden (born 1944), American politician
 Nicky Hayden (1981–2017), American motorcycle racer (brother of Roger Lee and Tomy Hayden)
 Pamela Hayden (born 1953), American voice actress
 Patrick Nielsen Hayden (born 1959), American science fiction editor
 Robert Hayden (1913–1980), African-American educator and poet
 Roger Hayden (born 1980), Australian rules footballer
 Roger Lee Hayden (born 1983), American motorcycle racer (brother of Nicky and Tommy Hayden)
 Salter Hayden, Canadian lawyer and senator
 Samuel Augustus Hayden (1839–1918), American Baptist pastor and newspaper publisher
 Samuel Hayden, Canadian politician
 Scott Hayden (1882–1915), African-American composer of ragtime music
 Sophia Hayden (1868–1953), American architect
 Sterling Hayden (1916–1986), American film actor
 Steve Hayden (copywriter), American advertising executive and copywriter
 Teresa Nielsen Hayden (born 1956), American essayist and editor
 Tom Hayden (1939-2016), American civil rights activist and politician serving as a California state Representative and state Senator
 Tom Hayden (Texas politician) (born 1967), mayor of Flower Mound, Texas
 Tommy Hayden (born 1978), American motorcycle racer (brother of Nicky and Roger Lee Hayden)
 Torey Hayden (born 1951), American child psychologist
 Vanessa Hayden (basketball) (born 1982), American professional women's basketball player
 Will Hayden (born 1965), American criminal and former TV personality

Fictional characters with the surname Hayden 
 Dr. Samuel Hayden - a major character in the 2016 video game Doom, as well as a secondary protagonist of its 2020 sequel, Doom Eternal.
Roger Hayden - The Psycho-Pirate, a DC Comics supervillain.

See also 
 Hayden (given name)
 Haydn (name), given name and surname

References

English-language surnames